This is a list of places and things named for Anthony Wayne, a general in the U.S. Army.

Boroughs

Waynesboro, Pennsylvania
Waynesburg, Pennsylvania

Cities

Fort Wayne, Indiana
Wayne, Michigan
Wayne, Nebraska
Waynesboro, Georgia
Waynesboro, Mississippi
Waynesboro, Tennessee
Waynesboro, Virginia

Communities

Wayne, Pennsylvania
Waynedale, Fort Wayne, Indiana
Waynewood, Alexandria, Virginia

Counties

 Wayne County, Georgia
 Wayne County, Illinois
 Wayne County, Indiana
 Wayne County, Iowa
 Wayne County, Kentucky
 Wayne County, Michigan
 Wayne County, Mississippi
 Wayne County, Missouri
 Wayne County, Nebraska
 Wayne County, New York
 Wayne County, North Carolina
 Wayne County, Ohio
 Wayne County, Pennsylvania
 Wayne County, Tennessee
 Wayne County, West Virginia
 Wayne County, Utah

Forests and parks

 Wayne National Forest in Ohio
 Anthony Wayne Recreation Area, part of Harriman State Park, in New York State
 Wayne Square, in Tallahassee, Florida – present location of City Hall and one of 5 public squares established in the city's original plan
 Wayne Park in Beaver, Pennsylvania
General Wayne Park Merion, Pennsylvania

Towns

Wayne, Maine
Waynesville, Missouri
Wayne, New Jersey
Wayne, New York
Waynesville, North Carolina
Wayne, Oklahoma
Wayne, Pennsylvania
Wayne, West Virginia
South Wayne, Wisconsin
Waynesville, Georgia

Townships

 Wayne Township, Ohio
 Wayne Township, Illinois
 Wayne Township, Allen County, Indiana
 Wayne Township, Marion County Indiana
 The former Wayne Township, Montgomery County, Ohio (now the city of Huber Heights)
 Wayne Township, New Jersey
 Wayne Township, Lawrence County, Pennsylvania
 the former Mad River Township and Mad River Township Local School District (now Riverside, Ohio)

Villages

Wayne, Illinois
Wayne, Ohio
Waynesburg, Ohio
Waynesfield, Ohio
Waynesville, Illinois
Waynesville, Ohio
Wayne City, Illinois
Waynesburg, Ohio

Schools and Colleges

 Anthony Wayne School in Philadelphia, Pennsylvania
 Anthony Wayne Elementary School in Defiance, Ohio
 Anthony Wayne Elementary School in Franklin, Ohio
 Wayne Trace High School in Paulding, Ohio
 Anthony Wayne Middle School in Wayne, New Jersey
 Anthony Wayne High School in Whitehouse, Ohio
 Anthony Wayne Local Schools, Ohio, whose sports teams are known as the "Fighting Generals"
 General Wayne Elementary School, in Malvern, Pennsylvania
 Wayne Central High School in Ontario, New York
 Wayne County High School, in Monticello, Kentucky
 Wayne Community School District in Corydon, Iowa
 Wayne County Community College in Detroit, Michigan
 Wayne Elementary School in Erie, Pennsylvania
 Wayne High School in Huber Heights, Ohio
 Wayne High School in, Fort Wayne, Indiana
 Wayne State College in Wayne, Nebraska
 Wayne State University in, Detroit
 Waynesboro Area Senior High School in, Waynesboro, Pennsylvania
 Waynesboro High School in Waynesboro, Virginia
 Waynesburg University in Waynesburg, Pennsylvania
 Waynesfield-Goshen Schools in, Waynesfield, Ohio
 Anthony Wayne Elementary School in Detroit, Michigan
 Wayne Trail Elementary School in Maumee, Ohio
 Anthony Wayne High School in Whitehouse, Ohio
 Anthony Wayne Elementary School in Ambridge, Pennsylvania
 Wayne County High School (Waynesboro, Mississippi)
 Wayne Memorial High School, Wayne, Michigan
Wayne High School, Wayne, West Virginia
Wayne Middle School, Wayne, West Virginia
Wayne Elementary School, Wayne, West Virginia

Streets and highways

 Anthony Street, Celina, Ohio
 Anthony Boulevard, Fort Wayne, Indiana
 Anthony Wayne Avenue, Cincinnati, Ohio
 Anthony Wayne Drive, Detroit, Michigan
 Anthony Wayne Drive, Baden, Pennsylvania
 Anthony Wayne Drive, Chesterbrook, Pennsylvania
 Anthony Wayne Drive, Warminster, Pennsylvania
 Anthony Wayne Trail, Toledo, Ohio
 Anthwyn Road, Merion, Pennsylvania (across from the inn)
 Mad Anthony Street, Cincinnati, Ohio
 Mad Anthony Street, Millersburg, Ohio
 Mad River Road, Hillsboro, Ohio
 North Wayne Avenue, Lockland, Ohio
 North Wayne Street, West Chester, Pennsylvania
 South Wayne Avenue, Fort Wayne, Indiana
 South Wayne Avenue, Lockland, Ohio
 South Wayne Avenue, Waynesboro, Virginia
 South Wayne Street, West Chester, Pennsylvania
 Southwest Anthony Wayne Drive, Fort Wayne, Indiana
 Wayne Avenue, Ticonderoga, New York
 Wayne Avenue, Bronx, New York
 Wayne Avenue, Chambersburg, Pennsylvania
 Wayne Avenue, Collingdale, Pennsylvania
 Wayne Avenue, Chicago, Illinois
 Wayne Avenue, Dayton, Ohio
 Wayne Avenue (Rte 112), Stony Point, New York
 Wayne Avenue, Philadelphia, Pennsylvania
 Wayne Avenue, Greenville, Ohio
 Wayne Road, running through (from north to south) the municipalities of; Livonia, Westland, Wayne, and Romulus, Michigan
 Wayne Street, Celina, Ohio
 Wayne Street, Fort Recovery, Ohio
 Wayne Street, Fort Wayne, Indiana
 Wayne Street, Toledo, Ohio
 Wayne Street, Erie, Pennsylvania
 Wayne Street North, South Bend, Indiana
 Wayne Street South, South Bend, Indiana
 Wayne Trace, Fort Wayne, Indiana
 Wayne Trace Road, running from Eaton in Preble County, Ohio, to just outside of Seven Mile in Butler County, Ohio

Structures and businesses

The former Anthony Wayne Bank in Fort Wayne
 Former Anthony Wayne Drive-In Movie, Wayne Township, New Jersey
 Anthony Wayne Barber Shop in Maumee, Ohio
 Anthony Wayne, a campsite at Woodland Trails Scout Reservation in Camden, Ohio
 The Anthony Wayne Movie Theater in Wayne, Pennsylvania
 Anthony Wayne Recreation Area in Harriman State Park, New York
 AWS, formerly Anthony Wayne Rehabilitation Center for the Handicapped and Blind, Inc. in Fort Wayne, Indiana
Anthony Wayne Suspension Bridge near downtown Toledo, Ohio
 Anthony Wayne Terrace Housing Association Baden, Pennsylvania
 Mad Anthony Brewing Company, in Fort Wayne, Indiana
Fort Wayne in Fort Wayne, Indiana
Fort Wayne in Detroit, Michigan
 The Fort Wayne Mad Ants basketball team of the NBA G League
General Wayne Inn in Merion, Pennsylvania
 "Mad Anthony's", a local pub in Waterville, Ohio
Wayne Corporation, defunct school bus manufacturer, originally Wayne Agricultural Works, then Wayne Works
 Wayne Hospital in Greenville, Ohio
 Anthony Wayne Hotel in Akron, Ohio, demolished in 1996
 Anthony Wayne Motel in Yellow Springs, Ohio on US Route 68
 General Wayne Inn, Honey Brook, Pennsylvania on US Route 322
 Anthony Wayne Hotel in downtown Hamilton, Ohio renovated into the Anthony Wayne Apartments
 Hotel Wayne and restaurant in Honesdale, Pennsylvania
 Mad Anthony's Bottle Shop & Beer Garden in Waynesville, NC
 Wayne Oil Inc. in Fort Recovery, Ohio
 Wayne Hose Company No. 1 of the Stony Point, New York fire department

In transportation

 The Gen. "Mad" Anthony Wayne, a side-wheel steamboat, sank in April 1850 in Lake Erie while en route from the Toledo, Ohio, area to Buffalo, New York. Out of 93 passengers and crew on board, 38 died. On June 21, 2007, it was announced that the wreck had been discovered by Thomas Kowalczk, an amateur shipwreck hunter.
 Major General Anthony Wayne, U.S. Army tugboat based at Southampton, UK.

In literature and publications
 Wayne is mentioned in Donald Barthelme's novel, The King.
 Contrary to the popular belief that Bruce Wayne (the real name of the superhero character Batman) was named after John Wayne, comic book writer Bill Finger named Batman's alter ego after Robert the Bruce and Anthony Wayne. In DC Comics, Bruce Wayne is depicted as General Anthony Wayne's direct descendant, and on one occasion Bruce Wayne, as Batman, traveled back in time and met Anthony Wayne. Furthermore, the property on which Wayne Manor is built was given to General Wayne for his service during the Revolution. Rumors that Bruce's middle name is "Anthony" have yet to be confirmed by DC Comics.
 In F. Scott Fitzgerald's Tender Is the Night (1934), Dick Diver mentions his descent from Mad Anthony Wayne.
 Anthony Wayne is one of the main characters in Ann Rinaldi's historical novel, A Ride into Morning.
 Mad Anthony Wayne is a character in Diana Gabaldon's Outlander series. He features in An Echo in the Bone and Written in My Own Heart's Blood.

In products
 Mad Anthony Ale (Mad Anthony's APA), an American Pale Ale (APA) brewed by the Erie Brewing Company in Erie, Pennsylvania.

Onscreen
 Actor Marion Morrison was initially given the stage name of Anthony Wayne, after the general, by Fox Studio head Winfield Sheenan and Raoul Walsh, who directed The Big Trail (1930), but Fox Studios changed it to John Wayne instead, saying "Anthony" sounded "too Italian". John Wayne was leading man in 142 of his 153 movies, more than any other actor in history.
 In "Guy Walks Into a Psychiatrist's Office...", the Season Two premiere of The Sopranos, the character Dr. Jennifer Melfi is shown seeing patients at the "Anthony Wayne Motel" in Wayne, New Jersey, while on the lam, in fear for her life.
 The 1971 made-for-TV movie Assault on the Wayne, starring Leonard Nimoy, takes place on board the submarine U.S.S. Anthony Wayne.
 In Boardwalk Empire, S3E09, antagonist Gyp Rosetti admires a glass encased colonial hat from, as he says, "Mad Anthony Wayne". Rosetti later steals this hat at the end of the episode and wears it as he watches over his illegal alcohol business.

In sculpture
 General Anthony Wayne relief, by James Edward Kelly in Tryon, North Carolina, 1896
 The Wayne County Building in Detroit, Michigan, features a pediment by Edward Wagner that depicts an equestrian Wayne, c. 1900
 Equestrian statue by Henry Kirke Bush-Brown at Valley Forge, 1908
 Anthony Wayne Monument by George Etienne Ganiere, Fort Wayne, Indiana, 1918
 Battle of Fallen Timbers Monument  also known as the Anthony Wayne Monument, by Bruce Saville, Maumee, Ohio, 1929
 Equestrian statue by John Gregory, Philadelphia, Pennsylvania, 1937

References

Wayne, Anthony
Wayne, Anthony place names
Wayne